Chaure Bapu Hari (born 1 January 1949) is a member of the 14th Lok Sabha of India. He represents the Dhule constituency of Maharashtra and is a member of the Indian National Congress (INC) political party.

External links
 Official biographical sketch in Parliament of India website

Living people
1949 births
Indian National Congress politicians
India MPs 1991–1996
India MPs 2004–2009
People from Dhule
Marathi politicians
Lok Sabha members from Maharashtra
Bharatiya Janata Party politicians from Maharashtra
Indian National Congress politicians from Maharashtra